is a Japanese football player for Roasso Kumamoto.

Career
Mishima attended Chuo University despite a strong interest from Shimizu S-Pulse and then joined FC Gifu for 2018 season.

Club statistics
Updated to 29 August 2018.

References

External links

Profile at J. League
Profile at FC Gifu

1995 births
Living people
Association football people from Gifu Prefecture
Japanese footballers
J2 League players
J3 League players
FC Gifu players
Roasso Kumamoto players
Association football midfielders